Gladisch is a German language surname. Notable people with the name include:
 Silke Gladisch (1964), German athlete
 Walter Gladisch (1882–1954), German admiral

References 

German-language surnames